State Route 268 (SR 268) is a secondary state highway in Rutherford County and Murfreesboro, Tennessee, USA.

Route description
SR 268 runs from US 41/US 70S/SR 1 (North West Broad Street) on the north west side of Murfreesboro, to its Eastern terminus with SR 96 (Lascassas Pike), north-east of Murfreesboro.

It crosses the West Fork of the Stones River near its western end as it travels through the suburbs along the northern and western sides of Murfreesboro as a 2-lane highway, where it has an intersection with US 231/SR 10 (Memorial Boulevard). The highway then leaves the Murfreesboro city limits shortly before coming to its eastern end.

Locally, this route is known as Thompson Lane from US 41/US 70S to US 231 and Compton Road from US 231 to SR 96.

Major intersections

See also
List of Tennessee state highways
Tennessee Department of Transportation

268